Filotheos Theodoropoulos, born Dimitrios Theodoropoulos (Kato Nevrokopi, 1963) is, since 2019, the Bishop of Rogoi, assistant bishop of the Archbishopric of Athens.

References 

Greek clergy
1963 births
Living people
People from Kato Nevrokopi
National and Kapodistrian University of Athens alumni
Clergy from Athens